Windeck may refer to:

Geography
 Windeck, municipality in the county of Rhein-Sieg-Kreis in North Rhine-Westphalia, Germany
 Windeck (Eibingen), settlement above the Rüdesheim village of Eibingen in Hesse, Germany

Castles and palaces
  a ruined castle near Burgebrach (Steigerwald) in Bavaria, Germany
 Windeck Castle (Bühl), ruins near Bühl, Baden, Germany
 Windeck Castle (Heidesheim), in Heidesheim am Rhein in Rhenish Hesse, Germany
 New Windeck Castle, in Lauf (Baden), Baden-Württemberg, Germany
 Windeck Castle (Neidlingen), dilapidated castle near Neidlingen, Baden-Württemberg, Germany
 a palace, called Bürgle, in Niederzell on the island of Reichenau
 a palace in Ottrott im Lower Alsace
 Windegg Castle, ruins near Schwertberg, province of Perg in the Mühlviertel, Upper Austria
 Windeck Castle (Sieg), ruins in Windeck,  North Rhine-Westphalia, Germany
 Windeck Castle (Weinheim), ruins in Weinheim

People
 Agnes Windeck (1888–1975), pseudonym of the German actress, Agnes Sophie Windel
 Henry of Berg, Lord of Windeck (d 1295), vassal of the Landgrave of Thuringia

Others
  Windeck (Black Forest),   mountain in the southern Black Forest, Germany
 Windeck (TV series), an Angolan telenovela

See also
 Windegg (disambiguation)